Lake Alice is a small lake at the eastern end of Te Houhou / George Sound approximately 52 km north west of Te Anau in the Southland region of the South Island. The lake is fed by the Edith River and flows into George Sound via Alice Falls.

Lakes of Fiordland